Bryse Everett Wilson (born December 20, 1997) is an American professional baseball pitcher for the Milwaukee Brewers of Major League Baseball (MLB). He previously played in MLB for the Atlanta Braves and Pittsburgh Pirates. Wilson was drafted by the Braves in the fourth round of the 2016 MLB draft and made his MLB debut in 2018.

Early life and amateur career
Bryse Wilson was born on December 20, 1997, in Durham, North Carolina, to parents Chad and Tracey. His father is a truck driver, and his mother works for Blue Cross Blue Shield of North Carolina. He has a younger brother Payton, who plays for the NC State Wolfpack football team.

Wilson attended Orange High School in Hillsborough, North Carolina and played both baseball and football. As a senior, he was named The News & Observer's high school athlete of the year. That year, Wilson pitched to a 10–2 record, with six shutouts and three no-hitters, as well as a perfect game in the 3A playoffs. In his high school career, he won 33 games, and lost only four. Wilson was drafted by the Atlanta Braves in the fourth round of the 2016 Major League Baseball Draft, 109th overall, and offered a $1.2 million signing bonus.

Professional career

Atlanta Braves
Wilson made his professional debut with the Gulf Coast Braves in 2016, going 1–1 with an 0.68 ERA in 26.2 innings pitched. He spent 2017 with the Rome Braves and was selected to the South Atlantic League All-Star Game. Wilson posted a 10–7 record, 2.50 ERA, and 139 strikeouts in 137 total innings pitched for Rome.

He began the 2018 season with the Florida Fire Frogs, and in May, was promoted to the Mississippi Braves. On July 31, Wilson joined the Gwinnett Stripers. Across three minor league levels prior to his promotion to the major leagues, Wilson started 23 games, compiling an 8–5  win–loss record and 3.23 ERA.

Wilson was promoted to the major leagues on August 20, 2018, and debuted the same day against the Pittsburgh Pirates. Wilson pitched five innings, yielding three hits and three walks alongside five strikeouts. He earned the victory in the Braves' 1–0 win, and became the youngest pitcher to win his debut by that score. Wilson was optioned to Gwinnett after the game. In 2018 with the Braves he pitched seven innings over three games.

In 2019, he was 1–1 with a 7.20	ERA in 20.0 innings over six games (four starts).

In 2020, he was 1–0 with one save and a 4.02 ERA in 15.2 innings over six games (two starts).

Wilson was announced as Atlanta’s Game 4 starter in the NLCS on October 14, 2020. The following day, in his first postseason start, Wilson gave up one run over six innings with 5 strikeouts. The Braves handled the Dodgers, 10–2, to go up 3–1 in the series.

Pittsburgh Pirates
On July 30, 2021, Wilson was traded to the Pittsburgh Pirates along with Ricky DeVito in exchange for Richard Rodríguez. He was designated for assignment on December 28, 2022.

Milwaukee Brewers
On January 4, 2023, Wilson was traded to the Milwaukee Brewers in exchange for cash considerations.

References

External links

1997 births
Living people
Sportspeople from Durham, North Carolina
Baseball players from North Carolina
Major League Baseball pitchers
Atlanta Braves players
Pittsburgh Pirates players
Gulf Coast Braves players
Rome Braves players
Florida Fire Frogs players
Mississippi Braves players
Gwinnett Stripers players